Khorkuto is an 2020 Indian Bengali language romantic comedy drama television series that premiered on 17 August 2020 and airs on Bengali General Entertainment Channel Star Jalsha and is also available on the digital platform Disney+ Hotstar. The show is produced by Magic Moments Motion Pictures of Saibal Banerjee and Leena Gangopadhyay and starred Trina Saha and Koushik Roy.

Plot
Gungun, a sophisticated upper-class girl, crosses paths with Soujanyo, a scholar who belongs to a middle-class joint family, and everything changes. Apart from a beautiful love story, ‘Khorkuto’ narrates the tale of a joint family, its roots and beliefs. After a few meetings with Soujanyo, Gungun's father decides to marry Gungun off with Soujanyo to teach her morals and ethics. Although Gungun is a little ill-mannered, she is very good at heart and gets deserved love from Soujanyo' s family. She becomes a part of the family and stands by them through all their difficulties.

The show came to an end on 21 August 2022 with the sudden death of Gungun and the story jumps to 25 years later when Soujanya and Gungun's son Ishaan finds Dr. Shrotoshwini Majumder (also named as Gungun), a therapist in the hospital, the whole family rejoice on seeing the repeating story of Soujanya and Gungun to the next generation.

Cast

Main
 Trina Saha as
Shrotoshwini "Gungun" Bose – Kaushik and Shilpi's daughter; Babin's wife; Ishaan' mother (Dead) (2020-2022)
Shrotoshwini "Gungun" Majumder – A therapist; Koushik's daughter (2022).
 Koushik Roy as
Soujanyo "Babin" Mukherjee – A scientist; Bhajan and Chandana's son; Chini's brother; Riju, Munia and Shaaji's cousin; Gungun's widower; Ishaan's Father (2020-2022)
Dr. Sourin "Ishaan" Mukherjee – An oncologist; Gungun and Soujanyo's son (2022)

Recurring

 Dulal Lahiri as Siddheshwar "Jethai" Mukherjee – Bhajan, Putu and Potka's brother; Nonibala's widower; Riju and Munia's father; Adil and Puchu's grandfather. (2020-2022) 
 Ratna Ghoshal as Nonibala Mukherjee – Jethai's wife; Riju and Munia's mother; Adil and Puchu's grandmother. (2020-2022)(Dead).
 Chandan Sen as Trilokeshwar "Bhajan" Mukherjee – Jethai, Putu and Potka's brother; Chandana's husband; Babin and Chini's father; Ishaan's grandfather (2020-2022) 
 Anushree Das as Basumati "Chandana" Mukherjee – Bhajan's wife; Babin and Chini's mother; Ishaan's grandmother. (2020-2022)
 Sohini Sengupta as Meghomala "Putu" Mukerjee Chatterjee – A Teacher; Jethai, Bhajan and Potka's sister; Sukalyan's wife. (2020-2022) 
 Badshah Moitra as Dr. Sukalyan Chatterjee – Putu's husband. (2020-2021) 
 Ambarish Bhattacharya as Kamaleshwar "Potka" Mukherjee – Jethai, Bhajan and Putu's brother; Jaya's husband; Shaaji's father.(2020-2022)
 Jayashree Mukherjee Kaul as Suchitra "Jaya" Mukherjee – Potka's wife; Shaaji's mother. (2020-2022)
Debasish Roy Chowdhury as Partha Chatterjee - Rupanjan's father.
Madhumita Basu as Mandira Chatterjee - Rupanjan's mother.
 Debottam Majumdar as Abhijnan "Riju" Mukherjee – Jethai and Nonibala's son; Munia's brother; Babin, Chini and Shaaji's cousin; Mishti's husband; Puchu's father (2020-2022)
 Rajanya Mitra as Nabamita "Mishti" Mukherjee – Riju's wife; Puchu's mother (2020-2022)
 Priyanka Mitra as Imon "Chini" Mukherjee Chatterjee – Bhajan and Chandana's daughter; Babin's sister; Riju, Munia and Shaaji's cousin; Rupanjan's wife (2020-2022)
 Raja Goswami as Rupanjan Chatterjee – Chini's husband (2020-2022)
 Sonal Mishra as Doyelpakhi "Shaaji" Mukherjee Singha – A college professor; Potka and Jaya's daughter; Riju, Munia, Babin and Chini's cousin; Gungun's friend; Sroth's ex-wife; Arjun's wife(2020-2022)
 Sayanta Modak as Dr. Arjun Singha – A professor; Shaji's second husband (2022)
 Sayantan Halder as Sroth Sengupta – Shaji's ex-husband (2022) 
Rishav Basu as Adil "Adi" Sheikh – Munia's son. (2021) 
Abhishek Chatterjee as Dr. Kaushik Bose – A Surgeon; Jui's brother; Shilpi's husband; Gungun's father; Ishaan's grandfather. (2020-2022) (Dead)
 Malabika Sen as Dr. Shilpi Bose – Kaushik's widow; Gungun's mother; Ishaan's grandmother. (2020-2022)
 Suchismita Chowdhury as Jui Bose Sengupta – Kaushik's sister; Tinni's mother; Gungun's aunt. (2020-2022) 
 Rukma Roy as Ananya "Tinni" Sengupta – Jui's daughter; Gungun's cousin and rival; Babin's research assistant. (2020-2021) 
Sujoy Biswas as Soujanyo's Institute's Dean. (2020-2022)
Arup Kumar Roy as Shubho da
Atmandeep Ghosh as Krish – Gungun's namesake boyfriend. (2020) 
 Asmee Ghosh as Jhum – Sukalyan's adopted daughter. (2020-2021) 
 Kanyakumari Mukherjee as Deblina – Jhum's mother. (2020-2021) 
 Diganta Bagchi as lawyer of Tinni. (2021) 
 Shampa Banerjee as lawyer of Soujanyo. (2021) 
 Chitra Sen as Kanakbala (2021) 
 Chaitali Chakraborty as Sroth's mother. (2022)

Reception

Ratings

Adaptations

References

External links
 Khorkuto at Hotstar
 

Bengali-language television programming in India
2020 Indian television series debuts
Star Jalsha original programming
Indian drama television series
2022 Indian television series endings